Christoph Hafer (born 14 April 1992) is a German bobsledder.

Career
Hafer started with the sport of luge on the Königssee bobsleigh, luge, and skeleton track at the age of nine. In 2010, he switched to bobsleigh and has been part of the German national team since 2014. Hafer starts for BC Bad Feilnbach and Eintracht Wiesbaden. He is coached by Thomas Prange. Since 2014, he has been in the top-level sport promotion with the Bavarian State Police where he holds the rank of Polizeimeister (Constable) since 2018.

References

External links

Christoph Hafer at the German Bobsleigh, Luge, and Skeleton Federation 

1992 births
Living people
Olympic bobsledders of Germany
People from Rosenheim (district)
Sportspeople from Upper Bavaria
Bobsledders at the 2022 Winter Olympics
Medalists at the 2022 Winter Olympics
Olympic medalists in bobsleigh
Olympic bronze medalists for Germany
German male bobsledders
21st-century German people